C/1962 C1 (Seki–Lines), also known as Comet Seki–Lines and 1962c, was a non-periodic comet discovered indepently by Richard D. Lines and Tsutomu Seki on 4 February 1962.

Observational history 
The comet was discovered independently by Richard D. Lines and Tsutomu Seki on 4 February 1962. The comet then was located near ζ Puppis and its apparent magnitude was estimated by the Lowell Observatory to be 8 two days later. At the end of February and early March the comet became visible by naked eye, as it crossed the constellations of Eridanus and Cetus. The comet brightened rapidly and by 27 March its magnitude was estimated to be 0 to -1. The comet reached its perihelion on 1 April 1962, at a distance of about 4 million kilometers from the Sun, and although it should have been bright enough, no daylight observations were reported.

After perihelion the comet became visible in the northwestern evening twilight on 3 April, with an estimated magnitude of -2.5. The comet had a slightly curved tail whose reported length was 10 to 15 degrees. The tail featured small striae in photographs. The tail also appeared split to in two. The comet faded rapidly during April, as its distance to both the Sun and Earth increased and could no longer be observed by the end of the month. At late May the comet remained low as it moved in conjunction with the Sun. It was last photographed on May 30, with the comet located low in twilight. Its tail was measured to be 2.5 arcminutes in length.

The comet was reobserved photographically on 27 and 28 October 1962 and on 27 November 1962 by the Flagstaff observatory. The comet was last observed on 25 January 1963, as photographic attempts in February failed to locate the comet.

Scientific results 
The spectrum of the comet before perihelion was similar to that of comet Mrkos, having similar intensity of diatomic carbon and NH2. Also present were the [O I] and the sodium D-line, which had spatial assymetry.

References 

Non-periodic comets
1962 in science
19620204
Discoveries by amateur astronomers
Sungrazing comets